Robert "Bob" Ramsey (born 1947) is an American politician. He serves as a Republican member of the Tennessee House of Representatives for district 20, encompassing parts of Blount County, Tennessee.

Biography

Early life
He was born on March 13, 1947. He received a Bachelor of Science in Biology from the University of Tennessee in Knoxville, Tennessee and a D.D.S. from the University of Tennessee Health Science Center in Memphis, Tennessee.

Career
He works as a dentist.

He is a state representative for the 20th District of Tennessee, having been reelected in 2012, 2014, 2016, 2018, and 2020. He supports efforts by the state legislature to reduce the number of bills proposed by individual lawmakers in order to reduce the backlog of legislations.

He is a member of the Blount County Board of Health, the Regional Solid Waste Authority, the Agricultural Extension Committee, the Community Action Agency, the Regional Planning Commission, and the Kiwanis Club of Maryville.

Personal life
He is married to Margaret Ramsey. They have two children, Heather and Haley, and two granddaughters, Valentina and Greer. He is a Baptist. He lives in Maryville, Tennessee.

References

Living people
1947 births
People from Maryville, Tennessee
University of Tennessee alumni
Tennessee Republicans
21st-century American politicians